Samuel David Baker (born May 30, 1985) is a former American football offensive tackle.  He played college football for the University of Southern California (USC), and was a three-time All-American.  He was selected by the Atlanta Falcons in the first round of the 2008 NFL Draft.

Early years
Baker was born in Tustin, California.  He graduated from Tustin High School, where Frostee Rucker, Matt McCoy, Chris Chester, and DeShaun Foster went.  He played in the 2003 U.S. Army All-American Bowl.

College career

Baker attended the University of Southern California, where he played for coach Pete Carroll's USC Trojans football team from 2003 to 2007.  He was a first-team All-American as a redshirt sophomore in 2005.

He was on the official 2006 watch list for the Lombardi Award and the Outland Trophy for the best lineman.  In his collegiate career Baker blocked for Reggie Bush and Matt Leinart.  He was named a first-team All-Pacific-10 Conference selection by the league's coaches in 2005 and 2006.  He was a recognized as a consensus first-team All-American, having received first-team honors from the Football Writers Association of America, Sporting News and CBSSports.com.

Going into his fourth year as a starter, Baker was on the Lombardi Award and Outland Trophy watch lists.  He was ranked as one of the "Top 20 Players Heading Into 2007" by Sports Illustrated.  Before his final season in 2007, Baker was already regarded by most NFL scouts as a certain top-five player in the 2008 NFL Draft.

During the 2007 season, Baker took on a leadership role in the offensive line, taking over the reins from departed senior Ryan Kalil and providing motivation as well as helping teach younger players.

Despite suffering from injuries that held him out of games, Baker was again a first-team All-Pac-10 selection for his third consecutive year.  Baker was also named Walter Camp first-team All-American in 2007.

Professional career

Atlanta Falcons

Sam Baker was drafted by the Atlanta Falcons in the first round (21st overall) of the 2008 NFL Draft after the Falcons traded two of their second-round picks (No. 34 and No. 48) and a fourth round pick (No. 103) with the Washington Redskins to move to No. 21 overall. On July 25, he signed a multi-year contract. In his rookie year, 2008, Baker started 5 games. On March 13, 2013, Baker re-signed with the Falcons for six years worth $41.5 million, including $18.25 million guaranteed.

Baker's career was marred by injuries and he only competed in all 16 games in two seasons (2010 and 2012).  He played in four games in 2013 before suffering a torn left patellar tendon which sidelined him for the rest of the year. In the second game of the 2014 preseason, Baker suffered a torn patellar tendon injury in his right knee, which ended his season. Baker was released on June 15, 2015.

Personal
Baker is the son of former Pro Football Hall of Fame President & CEO and former Arena Football League commissioner C. David Baker.  Sam married his wife, Antoinette, in 2008. He also is the brother of Ben Baker, who is the Senior Director of Broadcasting for NASCAR.

References

External links
Atlanta Falcons bio
USC Trojans bio

1985 births
Living people
People from Tustin, California
Sportspeople from Orange County, California
Players of American football from California
American football offensive tackles
USC Trojans football players
All-American college football players
Atlanta Falcons players